was a stable of sumo wrestlers, one of the Nishonoseki ichimon or group of stables. As of September 2010 it had eight active wrestlers.

The stable was established in 1981 by former ōzeki Kaiketsu Masateru, as a breakaway from Hanakago stable. Among the wrestlers who went with him was Ōnokuni, who reached the top makuuchi division in 1983. In 1985 its parent stable folded and it took in the remaining Hanakago wrestlers, including future makuuchi Hananoumi and Hananokuni. Ōnokuni became the 62nd yokozuna in 1987. The stable had less success in later years, and did not have a sekitori ranked wrestler after the retirement of Shunketsu in 2008.

In August 2010, Hanaregoma became the head of the Japan Sumo Association, a position he held until 2012.

On 7 February 2013, due to Hanaregoma′s imminent mandatory retirement, the stable was absorbed into Ōnokuni′s Shibatayama stable, which had branched off from its parent in 1999.

Owner
1981-2013: 19th Hanaregoma (former ōzeki Kaiketsu Masateru)

Notable wrestlers
Ōnokuni – best rank yokozuna
Hananoumi – best rank komusubi
Hananokuni – best rank maegashira 1
Misugiiso - best rank maegashira 2
Shunketsu – best rank maegashira 12
Komafudō - best rank maegashira 13
Hidenohana – best rank jūryō
Maeta - best rank makushita

Referees
Tamamitsu Kimura (real name Nobuhide Ueda) - san'yaku referee
Kichijiro Kimura (Masahiro Nishino) - makushita referee

Usher
Katsuyuki (Katsuyuki Koyama) - san'yaku usher

See also 
List of sumo stables

References

Defunct sumo stables